Şotavar (also, Shotavar) is a village and municipality in the Qakh Rayon of Azerbaijan.  It has a population of 1,008.

References 

Populated places in Qakh District